Urbem Media (品味全城) is a Chinese luxury-dining club headquartered in Shanghai, initially released as a WeChat service account in 2015.

History
Urbem Media was founded in Shanghai in early 2015 by University of Oxford graduate Steven Chen. Urbem Media was established in May 2015 and entered the  Chinaaccelerator startup programme in September 2015. In January 2016, Urbem released its main function, the patent-pending Ubot, that provides answers to users’ enquiries in real-time and provides recommendations based on users’ location, dining preferences and food category.

According to William Bao Bean, managing director of  Chinaaccelerator, Urbem Media is part of Chinese startups that leverage WeChat’s functions, allowing them to cut marketing costs as opposed to traditional technology startups.

Features
Its WeChat service account provides recommendations to users via its Ubot. Its main product, the VIP TasteCard, is an annual membership that grants access to restaurant discounts. It also is  bilingual, with versions in both Chinese and English.

See also
 WeChat
 Tastecard
 Discount card
 Dining club

References

Gastronomical societies
Dining clubs